San Juan Islands National Monument is a U.S. National Monument located in the Salish Sea in the state of Washington. The monument protects archaeological sites of the Coast Salish peoples, lighthouses and relics of early European American settlers in the Pacific Northwest, and biodiversity of the island life in the region. The monument was created from existing federal land by President Barack Obama on March 25, 2013 under the Antiquities Act.

Geography
They are managed by the U.S. Bureau of Land Management as part of the National Landscape Conservation System.

See also
 List of national monuments of the United States

References

External links
 San Juan Islander - daily news site 
 BLM−Bureau of Land Management.gov: official San Juan Islands National Monument website 
 BLM.gov: Factsheet of San Juan Islands National Monument — including map.
  Islanders for the San Juan Islands National Monument
 Presidential Proclamation -- San Juan Islands National Monument, The White House (Office of the Press Secretary), March 25, 2013

National Monuments in Washington (state)
.
Bureau of Land Management National Monuments
Bureau of Land Management areas in Washington (state)
Protected areas of San Juan County, Washington
Protected areas of Skagit County, Washington
Protected areas of Whatcom County, Washington
2013 establishments in Washington (state)
Protected areas established in 2013
National Monuments designated by Barack Obama
Units of the National Landscape Conservation System